The Karama Armoured Warfare Training School (KAWATS), is an Armoured Warfare Training School in Uganda, East Africa. Typically, graduates are commanders in the Uganda People's Defence Force. Other African countries also send their military personnel to the school for training.

Location
The school is located in Kabamba, Mubende District, Central Uganda. The coordinates of Kabamba are:0°15'00.0"N, 31°11'06.0"E (Latitude:0.2500; Longitude:31.1850).

History
The school, built by Uganda's Ministry of Defence, at a cost of USh 1.8 billion (approximately US$730,000), was commissioned in February 2005. Medallion Engineering Limited, was the lead construction contractor. The school can accommodate approximately 450 students at one time. The current Commandant of KAWATS is Brigadier Francis Chemonges, formerly the Armoured Brigade Operations Officer.

See also

References

Military of Uganda
Schools in Uganda
Military academies
Military schools in Uganda
Uganda People's Defence Force
Mubende District